Mordellistena lebisi is a beetle in the genus Mordellistena of the family Mordellidae. It was described in 1937 by Maurice Pic.

References

lebisi
Beetles described in 1937